Andrew Rice (September 6, 1940 - February 11, 2018) was a professional American football player. He played college football for Texas Southern, and went to the American Football League's Kansas City Chiefs in 1965. After winning the American Football League Championship with the Chiefs in 1966, he started for them in the first AFL-NFL World Championship Game. Rice died on February 11, 2018.

See also
Other American Football League players

References

1940 births
2018 deaths
American football defensive linemen
Texas Southern Tigers football players
Kansas City Chiefs players
Houston Oilers players
Cincinnati Bengals players
San Diego Chargers players
Chicago Bears players
American Football League players
People from Hallettsville, Texas
Players of American football from Texas